Justin Diehl (born 27 November 2004) is a German professional footballer who plays for 1. FC Köln.

Club career 
On 7 August 2020, Diehl signed his first professional contract with FC Köln until 2023. He made his professional debut for Köln on 21 January 2023.

International career
Born in Germany, Diehl is of Ghanaian descent. He is a youth international for Germany, having played up to the Germany U19s.

References

External links

2004 births
Living people
Sportspeople from Cologne
German footballers
Germany youth international footballers
German sportspeople of Ghanaian descent
Association football forwards
1. FC Köln players
Bundesliga players